Ciudad Real is a municipality of Spain located in the autonomous community of Castile–La Mancha, capital of the province of Ciudad Real. It is the 5th most populated municipality in the region.

History 
It was founded with the name Villa Real ("Royal Town") under the auspice of Alfonso X, who granted it a charter that followed the model of Cuenca's. Located within the dominion of the Military Order of Calatrava, the repopulation struggled initially. Weary of the influence of Villa Real, an independent town directly dependent on the crown embedded within the territory dominated the Order of Calatrava, the masters of the Order established a rival market in nearby Miguelturra seeking to disrupt the town's economic activity.

During the Middle Ages, four kilometres of walls and one hundred and thirty towers protected a population made up of Christians, Muslims and Jews.

Villa Real hosted the Cortes of Castile in 1346.

Juan II of Castile granted Villa Real the status of city in 1420, thus becoming Ciudad Real ("Royal City"). The city most probably did not have more than 2000 inhabitants by the time and despite having celebrated Cortes once, the dominant city in the area was still Almagro.

This fact favoured its economic development which was shown by the construction of several important buildings. The 1755 Lisbon earthquake destroyed many of these buildings. In 1809, during the Peninsular War, French troops defeated the Spanish army and occupied the town, using the local hospital as their headquarters and barracks.

Following the creation of the province of Ciudad Real as per the 1833 territorial division, the status of provincial capital of Ciudad Real was challenged by the cities of Almagro and Manzanares, with a similar population by the mid-nineteenth century. However the initiatives intending to take the provincial capital out of Ciudad Real did not succeed.

Much of the centre was destroyed during the Spanish civil war.

Geography

Location 

Ciudad Real is located in the southern half of the Inner Plateau, in the central part of the Iberian Peninsula, at about 625 metres above sea level.

The city is part of the Campo de Calatrava natural region, a transitional region between the Montes and La Mancha, remarkable in the context of the Iberian Peninsula because of its volcanic origin. The plaza del Pilar is precisely built on the centre of a shallow volcanic maar. As Ciudad Real itself was the capital of the province of La Mancha in the 18th century, the whole province of Ciudad Real is often considered as part of La Mancha in a wider sense.

Despite enjoying a location at the crossroads of the Madrid–Andalusia and the Levante–Portugal corridors, the city did not particularly prosper historically thanks to this circumstance. The city currently forms a near urban continuum with neighbouring Miguelturra.

Climate 
The city has a hot-summer Mediterranean climate (Köppen: Csa), bordering on semi-arid (BSk), with cool winters (due to its altitude) and very hot dry summers.

The precipitation in the Campo de Calatrava is sparse, with a high year-to-year variability and the area features high levels of evapotranspiration, particularly in Summer.

Sports 

The city previously had a handball team, the BM Ciudad Real, which was the winner of the handball EHF Champions League in 2006, 2008 and 2009.

The handball club was one of the best in the world and its home arena, the Don Quixote Arena, was one of the biggest in the Spanish professional league. BM Ciudad Real, however, moved its team to Madrid in 2011; renamed as "Atlético Madrid", it dissolved in 2013.

Transport
The city has a railway station on the AVE high-speed rail line, the Ciudad Real railway station. 

A high-capacity airport (Ciudad Real Central Airport) was built in the city, but closed in 2012. The privately funded airport cost an estimated €1 billion to build, and is now for sale for €100 million plus payment of the developer's debt. Although in July 2014 this was reduced to €80 million in a further attempt to find a buyer.
In July 2015 the airport was auctioned resulting in only one bidder, Chinese company Tzaneen International offering €10,000.

The airport was reopened on 12 September 2019.

The average amount of time people spend commuting with public transit in Ciudad Real, for example to and from work, on a weekday is 33 min. 3% of public transit riders, ride for more than 2 hours every day. The average amount of time people wait at a stop or station for public transit is 8 min, while 1% of riders wait for over 20 minutes on average every day. The average distance people usually ride in a single trip with public transit is 2 km, while 0% travel for over 12 km in a single direction.

Main sights 

The Plaza Mayor sits in the centre of Ciudad Real. Today, only two parts of the wall that surrounded the city in medieval times remain standing: The Toledo Gate.
 
Don Quixote's Museum is situated next to Parque de Gasset.

The Museo Elisa Cendreros exhibits an old collection of fans and carved wood.

The Ermita de Alarcos is the oldest church in Ciudad Real. The Iglesia of Santiago is also the most beautiful and oldest church in Ciudad Real, it was built at the end of the 13th century in romanic style. Its style is Gothic. It is decorated with gothic paintings and with seven-headed dragons, the ceiling is decorated with stones forming eight pointed stars.

Another important church in Ciudad Real is Iglesia de San Pedro (Church of Saint Peter). It is the most interesting and typical monument of the city. It was built during the 14th and 15th centuries. Its style is Gothic, and it houses the tomb of Chantre de Coca, confessor and chaplain of the Catholic Monarchs.

Ciudad Real Cathedral, built in the 16th century, has the second-largest nave in Spain and a magnificent Baroque altarpiece.

Education 

Ciudad Real has 24 primary schools and 6 secondary schools.

The high school "Torreón del Alcázar" was founded in 1987. In the first years there were only vocational studies, thirty teachers and 350 students. Some years later the high school incorporated the compulsory secondary studies and A levels. At the moment there are 80 teachers and 1200 students. In the year 1995 the high school was offered the opportunity to become a bilingual school. In the year 2005 the first bilingual group arrived.

See University of Castilla–La Mancha (UCLM), Campus of Ciudad Real.

Events 
One of the most popular festivals in the city is La Pandorga, which takes place July 30 and 31. On the last day of the month the festival honours its patroness, La Virgen del Prado. The usual attire of the participants consists of jeans, a white shirt, and the traditional handkerchief.

People
 (born 1451), military captain who stood out during the Granada War.
 Manuel Cáceres Artesero (born 1949), known as "Manolo el del bombo", the most famous football fan in the world.
 Manuel Marín (1949–2017), president of the Congress of Deputies and acting president of the European Commission.
 José María Barreda (born 1953), former President of Castile–La Mancha.
 Fernando Luna (born 1958), professional tennis player.
 Juande Ramos (born 1954), former manager of Real Madrid Football Club.
 Javier Botet (born 1977), horror actor with Marfan syndrome.
 Jordi El Niño Polla (born 1994), male pornographic actor.

See also 
 Provincial Museum of Ciudad Real

References
Citations

Bibliography